Very little is known about Helian Chang's empress, the wife of Helian Chang.

When the Xia capital Tongwan (統萬, in modern Yulin, Shaanxi) fell to Northern Wei forces in 427, she was captured, along with her mother-in-law, even though her husband fled to Shanggui (上邽, in modern Tianshui, Gansu).  Nothing is known about her fate after she was captured.  After Helian Chang was captured by Northern Wei in 428, Emperor Taiwu of Northern Wei married one of his sisters, the Princess Shipping, to him.  The succession table below assumes that she was created empress when Helian Chang became emperor in 425, although that is obviously speculation.

References 

|- style="text-align: center;"

|-

|-

Xia (Sixteen Kingdoms) empresses